The Golden Fish may refer to:

The Golden Fish (film) (1959), aka Histoire d'un poisson rouge
Golden Fish (TV series), South Korean television
Le Poisson d'or (1867), a ballet in 4 acts by Arthur Saint-Léon
The Golden Fish (1925), a painting by Paul Klee
The Golden Fish from The Gold-Children, by the Brothers Grimm
The Golden-Headed Fish, an Armenian fairy tale
The Old Man and the Golden Fish, a Chinese folk tale
The wish-granting Golden Fish from The Tale of the Fisherman and the Fish a fairy tale by Alexander Pushkin
Two Golden Fish, one of the ashtamangala, the Eight Auspicious Signs of Buddhism

See also 
Goldfish
Goldfish (disambiguation)